John Anderson Fraser (4 April 1866 – 8 May 1960) was a Conservative member of the House of Commons of Canada. He was born in Shakespeare, Canada West and became a merchant and teacher.

He attended the secondary school Stratford Collegiate Institute and became a director of John A. Fraser and Company. He taught schools in Ontario and British Columbia.

Fraser entered provincial politics at the Cariboo riding for the Conservatives in the 1909 British Columbia election, joining fellow Conservative Michael Callanan in the two-member riding. He was re-elected there in 1912. After Cariboo was changed to a single-member riding, Fraser was the sole Conservative candidate in the 1916 provincial election but was defeated by John McKay Yorston of the Liberals.

He was elected to Parliament at the federal Cariboo riding in the 1925 general election then re-elected in 1926 and 1930. Fraser was defeated by James Gray Turgeon of the Liberals in the 1935 federal election.

References

External links
 

1866 births
1960 deaths
British Columbia Conservative Party MLAs
Canadian merchants
Canadian schoolteachers
Conservative Party of Canada (1867–1942) MPs
Members of the House of Commons of Canada from British Columbia
People from Perth County, Ontario